James Curry was a CFL player.

James Curry may also refer to:

James Walter Curry (1856–1924), Ontario barrister and political figure
James E. Curry (born 1948), bishop

See also
James Currie (disambiguation)